Coolangatta is an historic area in Australia, on the north shore of the Shoalhaven River on the New South Wales south coast.

History

Cullunghutti is a Jerrinja word meaning "splendid view".
Behind the settlement is a tall hill known as Coolangatta Mountain. In 1822 Scotsman Alexander Berry settled and built an estate (Coolangatta Estate) in the area, he was the first European to settle in the Shoalhaven area.  In 1846 the brigantine ship Coolangatta, named by Berry for his estate, was wrecked on what is today Queensland's Gold Coast.  It's from that ship that the better known Coolangatta, Queensland gets its name.

References

External links
 Coolangatta Estate Winery

City of Shoalhaven
Towns in New South Wales